79th Regiment may refer to:


Infantry units
 79th Infantry Regiment (Imperial Japanese Army)
 79th (The Queen's Own Cameron Highlanders) Regiment of Foot, a unit of the British Army, raised in 1793
 79th Regiment of Foot (1757), a British Army unit that took part in the Seven Years' War
 79th Regiment of Foot (Royal Liverpool Volunteers), a British Army unit that saw service in the West Indies during the American Revolution

Union Army units in the American Civil war
 79th Regiment Infantry U.S. Colored Troops
 79th Illinois Infantry Regiment
 79th Indiana Infantry Regiment
 79th New York Volunteer Infantry
 79th Ohio Infantry
 79th Pennsylvania Infantry

Other units
79th Field Artillery Regiment, United States

See also
 79th Brigade (disambiguation)
 79th Division (disambiguation)